Ştefăniţă Lupu, nicknamed Papură-Vodă (Bullrush Voivode; 1641 – 29 September 1661 in Tighina), son of Vasile Lupu, was Voivode (Prince) of Moldavia between 1659 and 1661, and again in 1661.

Life
Appointed by the Porte as a result of his father's efforts (during their in exile in Istanbul), Ştefăniţă took over the throne at the age of 16. His rule was twice overthrown by former Wallachian Prince Constantin Şerban, who occupied Iaşi and took over as Voivode. These harassments, coupled with Ottoman demands and Tatar raids, caused a deep crisis in Moldavia, worsened by an epidemic of what was thought to be the bubonic plague.

The ensuing famine accounts for Ştefăniţă's moniker: resources would have been so scarce that people resorted to grinding typha, and baking it as bread.

The Prince ended his life due to an illness, while assisting Turks and Tatars in fortifying Budjak against Cossacks.

See also

Rulers of Moldavia
1641 births
1661 deaths